Designed and built for heavy shunting work, the ŽS series 621 is a series of Czech-made diesel-electric shunting locomotives which is active on Serbian Railways.

History
Serbian Railways bought the first 621 series shunting locomotives in 2001. In 2005 another twenty-two locomotives were purchased and introduced into service.
Later two more second-hand shunters from Czech Republic industrial railways were also bought. 

The ŽS series 621 locomotive series is divided into sub-classes. These include the series 621-100, for the locomotives ordered in 2001, the series 621-200, for the locomotives ordered in 2005, and the series 621-300, for the two units bought second-hand.

This series was originally designated as the ČMKS 709, with series 621-100 being 709.401, 621-200 being 709.701 and 621-300 being 709.5. 

The Kolubara coal basin also bought 621 class locomotives for hauling lighter weight coal trains.

Currently there are fifteen locomotives in service with Serbian Railways while another two are operated by the rail transport division of the Kolubara coal basin.

Livery
Most of the locomotives currently have a yellow livery, although the final two 621-300 series shunters, bought second-hand from the Czech Republic, have a blue-white livery.
After being first bought the locomotives had a red-white livery. Two 621 series locomotives operated by Rail transport of Kolubara coal basin are painted in green-yellow-black livery.

Nicknames
The class has a variety of nicknames. These include "Žluťák" (Yellow) and "Vosička" (little wasp) as they were originally painted in a yellow livery, while another nickname was "Trafika" (Newsstand).

In popular culture

The locomotive is seen in the train simulator game Derail Valley. In game the locomotive is classified as DE2 (Diesel-Electric 2) and is usable after the player has completed the tutorial.

References

External links
Diesel locomotives - Serbian Railways official web site
Serbian Railways rolling stock

Bo locomotives
621
Ganz locomotives
Railway locomotives introduced in 1992
Standard gauge locomotives of Serbia